Cowperthwaite is a locational surname of English origin, which meant a person from a village in Yorkshire. It may refer to:

Colin Cowperthwaite (born 1959), English footballer
Gabriela Cowperthwaite (born 1971), American filmmaker
John James Cowperthwaite (1915-2006), English civil servant, Financial Secretary of Hong Kong from 1961 to 1971
John Cowperthwaite, English kit car designer
Niall Cowperthwaite (born 1992), English footballer